Amelia Anne Abbott (born 22 July 2001) is a New Zealand footballer who plays as a midfielder for the Texas Longhorns and the New Zealand national team.

Club career
Abbott played for Nelson Suburbs including the men's team as the only female in the competition.

International career
Abbott was part of the New Zealand U-17 team that won bronze at the 2018 FIFA U-17 Women's World Cup in Uruguay. She scored her only goal of the tournament, in the 1–1 quarter-final against Japan, which was nominated for goal of the tournament.

Abbott also played for the New Zealand U-20 team, winning the 2019 OFC U-19 Women's Championship in the Cook Islands which qualified them for the 2021 FIFA U-20 Women's World Cup before it was cancelled. She scored two goals in their record 30–0 win over Samoa.

She made her international debut for New Zealand in their 1–5 lost to Canada.

Personal life
Abbott attended Nelson College for Girls where she earned the Rose Bowl Award for the Highest Achieving Athlete.

Honours

Club
Canterbury United Pride: National Women's League Winners: 2018 and 2020

International
New Zealand U-17: 3rd place at the 2018 FIFA U-17 Women's World Cup
New Zealand U-20: Winners at the 2019 OFC U-19 Women's Championship

References

External links
 

2001 births
Living people
New Zealand women's association footballers
New Zealand women's international footballers
Women's association football midfielders
People educated at Nelson College for Girls
Texas Longhorns women's soccer players
New Zealand expatriate women's association footballers
New Zealand expatriate sportspeople in the United States
Sportspeople from Rotorua
Expatriate women's soccer players in the United States